The Rochester Knighthawks were a lacrosse team based in Rochester, New York, that played in the National Lacrosse League (NLL). The 2013 season was the 19th in franchise history.

The Knighthawks finished the season second in the East division with an 8-8 record. But for the second straight year, they got hot in the playoffs, defeating the Philadelphia Wings, Minnesota Swarm, and Washington Stealth to win their second straight NLL Championship.

Regular season

Final standings

Game log
Reference:

Playoffs

Game log
Reference:

Roster

Transactions

Trades

Entry Draft
The 2012 NLL Entry Draft took place on October 1, 2012. The Knighthawks made the following selections:

See also
2013 NLL season

References

Rochester Knighthawks seasons
2013 in lacrosse
Rochester Knighthawks